FC Bordo Saint Louis is a soccer organization based in St. Louis, Missouri. The team announced they would participate in the National Premier Soccer League starting with the 2014 season.

Staff
General Manager –  Sanjin Žigić (2014)
Head Coach –  Nenad Ćurić (2014)
Sports Director –  Boban Simović (2014)
Sales Development Manager  Taylor Madden (2014)

2014 Roster
Source:

2014 Standings

References

External links
FC Bordo St. Louis website

Soccer clubs in Missouri
National Premier Soccer League teams
2013 establishments in Missouri
Association football clubs established in 2013